Maria Gloriosa, or the Erfurt Bell, is a well-known bell of Erfurt Cathedral, cast by Geert van Wou in 1497. The world's largest medieval free-swinging bell, it is now swung electrically. It was welded in 1985 to repair a crack, then, in August 2004, the bell was re-fused due to another crack from 2001.

Diameter: , weight: 13 tons 15 cwts. [12555 kg], note: E [1497 standard]. Alternately: 2570mm, 11450 kg, note by today's standards: F-. It is about 2 meters tall.

As with any well-tuned bell the hum tone is near an octave below the strike tone, and all other notes are in tune including the minor third, fifth, octave, and major third and fifth in the second octave that may be heard in large bells.

Sources

Individual bells
Erfurt
1497 works